Luis Alejandro Ramos Leiva (born 13 December 1999) is a Peruvian footballer who plays as an attacking midfielder for Deportivo Llacuabamba, on loan from Peruvian Primera División side Deportivo Municipal.

Career

Club career
Ramos played for Cantolao, Juventud UNIDA in Trujillo and Andorra El Molino, before joining Carlos A. Mannucci. During his time in Juventud UNIDA, Ramos played in the Copa Peru in a young age. 17-year old Ramos scored 12 goals in the cup, which earned him a spot on the Peruvian U18 national team, after playing three friendly games where he scored three goals, in a national team training camp for young Copa Peru players in Trujillo.

Ramos got his debut in the Peruvian Primera División for Carlos A. Mannucci on 11 May 2019 against Sport Boys. He was in the starting lineup, but was replaced by Kevin Manuel Moreno after 65 minutes. He played a total of six games in the 2019 season and only one game in the 2020 season.

Ramos decided to leave Carlos A. Mannucci for the 2021, to chase more playing time elsewhere. He ended up joining Peruvian Segunda División club Deportivo Llacuabamba at the end of February 2021. After a good season at Llacuabamba, Ramos returned to the Primera División, after signing with Deportivo Municipal on 10 December 2021. To get some more playing time, Ramos was loaned out to Segunda Division side Deportivo Llacuabamba in June 2022 until the end of the year.

References

External links
 
 

Living people
1999 births
Association football midfielders
Peruvian footballers
Peruvian Primera División players
Peruvian Segunda División players
Academia Deportiva Cantolao players
Carlos A. Mannucci players
Deportivo Municipal footballers
People from Trujillo, Peru